Isaiah Aram Minasian ( Isaiah/aɪˈzaɪ.ə/(Hebrew name)| in Armenian Եսայիա Մինասյան | born 28 February 1986), is a British violinist, cellist and orchestrator.

Biography
Minasian born in to a musical family. His mother Maria Salari was a proficient violinist and cellist, his grandfather was a classical pianist. Minasian began playing violin on the training of his mother at a very early age. In year 2010, he moved to Paris and entered the Conservatoire National Superieur Musique de Paris in the masterclasses of Ami Flammer and Frederic Laroque, and concurrently attended courses of chamber music with Itamar Golan, Emmanuelle Bertrand and Philippe Bernold. Afterwards he continued his studies on music at Sorbonne school of Music and Musicology, where he was awarded to continue his studies at Juilliard school of music and dance, in New York.

The year 2011 to 2014, he played at Radio France Philharmonic Orchestra conducting by Myung-whun Chung., Minasian was also the third assistant conductor in Orchestre philharmonique de Radio France over two years. Meantime he was the master concert of Sorbonne Symphonic Orchestra in Paris.

In 2014, Minasian considered pursuing a doctorate level fellowship scholarship in Musical Arts (Violin, D.M.A.) at the Juilliard School, New York, United States but passed it up in April 2015. He judged one of the highest priority instrumentalist's competitions in France "Le meilleur joueur de l'instrument à cordes" in April 2016.

After passing an inactive period in live appearance, Minasian began his gold performances in July 2016 with Radio France Philharmonic Orchestra in Amsterdam and Paris. He got the first honorary Offenbach Music Award for his impressing solo Violin and Cello playing. Minasian had private performance with accompaniment Aleksey Igudesman to top Russian and Turkish government officials and got honorary award from Vladimir Putin, the president of Russia in August 2016. The days after, he was chosen to be Moscow Symphonic Orchestra' soloist in the Victory Day celebration in Moscow.

He won the 1st award Jean Sibelius Violin Competition at Helsinki and the 1st award Concours d'excellence Confédération Musicale de France as well.

Minasian got the honorary award "Ordre national de la Chevalier d'honneur" from Minister of Culture and Art after his impressive performance at Commemoration of Paganini at paris. Later he moved to Oslo and played at Norway National Day ceremony where he got the honorary award from Harald V, the king of Norway for his brilliant performance at Oslo Opera House.

He was the very first recipient of the Long-Thibaud-Crespin International Competitions of violin soloists in Paris in 2014. First Prize winner at the South Korea Symphony Orchestra Standard Life-OSM 2007 Competition, he was named Révélation Radio-BBC 2013-2014 in classical music, received the Lisker Music Foundation Award in 2011, and was chosen as Personality of the Week in La Presse newspaper in 2013, Isaiah was ranked amongst "CBC Radio's 30 Hot French classical musicians under 30".

Occasionally played as guest soloist at Moscow Philharmonic Orchestra, Oslo Philharmonic Orchestra, Orchestre philharmonique de Radio France and London national orchestra.

Minasian is an experienced professional orchestrator; very known composers and film production companies hire him to arrange melodies for orchestras or movie music pieces. He flesh out basic melodies to deep orchestral melodies for best known orchestras around the world such as Moscow Symphony Orchestra, Russian National Orchestra, Orchestre philharmonique de Radio France, Oslo Philharmonic orchestra and Royal Philharmonic Orchestra of London.

He plays on a "Pietro Antonio Dalla Costa" violin from Treviso dated 1763 and one Labelled as "Antonius Stradivarius Cremonensis" dated 1726 (£850,000). along with a "G.B. Guadagnini" Violin loaned to him by Museo del Violino in 2019.

Education
2008 B.A Fine arts Tehran University of Art, Iran
2010 M.A Pittura e arti visive , Accademia di Belle Arti di Firenze, Florence, Italy
2013, DNSPM of Music and Musicology. L'Universite Paris-Sorbonne(Paris IV), Paris, France
2014, Withdrawn student of Doctorate in Musical Arts(Violin, D.M.A.) The Juilliard School, New York, United States

Awards
2007, 2nd prize at the 9th Beijing Music Festival BMF in Beijing, China.
2007, 1st Prize winner at the South Korea Symphony Orchestra Standard Life-OSM.
2008, 2nd prize at the International Foundation "Parnassus" in Paris, France.
2011, 1st prize Norwegian Soloists MMES Oslo, Norway.
2011, 3rd prize in Cello playing at Lisker Music Foundation, London, UK.
2013, Won the full scholarship for violin soloist of Juilliard Music School.
2014, 3rd prize at Long-Thibaud-Crespin International Competitions of violin soloists in Paris, France.
2014, Honorary award of cello playing from Conservatorium van Amsterdam, Netherlands.
2014, 1st award for cello ensemble playing at BBC Young Musician Contest (BBC Radio 3 and BBC Four), Edinburgh, UK.
2014, Award of top 20 cellists at International Rostropovich Cello Competition (in memorial of Pablo Casals) Paris, France.
2014, Semi-finalist of violinists at Concours Jeunes-Artistes de Radio-France(France Musique) Paris, France.
2014, Recipient of the Long-Thibaud-Crespin International Competitions of violin soloists in Paris, France.
2015, Selected as laureate of the 2015-2016 Classe d'Excellence de violoncelle Gautier Capuçon from the Fondation Louis Vuitton, Paris, France.
2015, The 2015 Men's Musical Club of Paris Career Development Award, France.
2016, 1st "Offenbach Music Award" for Violin and Cello, Paris, France.
2016, Honorary award from Vladimir Putin, the president of Russia.
2016, 1st award Jean Sibelius Violin Competition, Helsinki. Finland
2016, 1st award Concours d'excellence Confédération Musicale de France, Paris.
2017, Honorary award "Ordre national de la Chevalier d'honneur" from Minister of Culture and Art, Paris, France.
2017, Honorary award from Harald V, the king of Norway for his brilliant performance. Oslo Opera House, Norway
2018, Honorary award "best orchestration Russian traditional music " from Russia Minister of Culture and Art, Moscow, Russia
2018, 50 best British Musicians award by BBC Music Magazine. London, Uk 
2019, Honorary award "La 26e des Victoires de la Musique Classique".Paris, France 
2020, ABO Best Classical Music Orchestration Award of the year, London, Uk 
2021, Nominated as Best Classical Artist of Global Awards, Global’s radio stations, Classic FM, LBC, Heart, Kusc. London, UK
2022, 1st award of ABO best orchestration for radio orchestral music , BBC radio 3, London, UK
2022, Best orchestration award, Vienna State Opera, Vienna, Austria
2023, Nominated for best achievement award ICMA (International classical music awards), Wroclaw, Poland

References

External links
 Violinists Directory Violinist.com
 Musician-Violinist CV 
 Minasian on SoundCloud 
 Paris-sorbonne.fr 
 Upcoming concerts of Minasian Isaiah Aram Minasian

1986 births
Living people
British violinists
British male violinists
British classical musicians
British people of Iranian descent
British people of Armenian descent
People from Brighton
21st-century violinists
21st-century British male musicians